RoseAnna Schick is an entertainment publicist based in Winnipeg, Canada. Her background is in the film and television industry, and she participated in a 'living history' television series in 2002 called Quest for the Bay. She often speaks at conferences and seminars, and is also a freelance travel and adventure writer.

References

External links
 http://rowwrc.wordpress.com/2011/05/06/roseanna-schick-wins-women-of-distinction-awards/
 http://www.cbc.ca/manitoba/scene/books/2012/02/22/bookmarked-roseanna-schick/
 http://uniter.ca/view/whose-house-roseannas-house

 website: http://www.ras-creative.com
 biography: http://www.ras-creative.com/about-us/
 blog: http://rascreative.wordpress.com/

Canadian public relations people
Year of birth missing (living people)
Place of birth missing (living people)
Living people
People from Winnipeg